Gilbert Lake is a small lake in Otsego County, New York. It is located northwest of Laurens within Gilbert Lake State Park. Lake Brook flows through the lake, then flows southeast before converging with Otego Creek. Lake of the Twin Fawns, located northwest of Gilbert Lake, drains south via Lake Brook into Gilbert Lake.

Fishing
Fish species present in the lake are largemouth bass, rainbow trout, pumpkinseed sunfish. The lake is accessed by a state-owned carry down boat launch in Gilbert Lake State Park.

References 

Lakes of New York (state)
Lakes of Otsego County, New York